The Prince's Rainforests Project (PRP) was set up in the UK in 2007 by Charles, Prince of Wales following reports from leading climate change experts, including the Intergovernmental Panel on Climate Change, to promote awareness of the urgent need to take action against tropical deforestation. The Prince of Wales has long been concerned about climate change and about how destruction of the world's rainforests contributes to rising temperatures and sea levels.

The project is working with governments, businesses and non-profit organisations around the world to quickly find solutions to deforestation, with the ambition of "making the trees worth more alive than dead".

On 5 May 2009, The Prince's Rainforests Project launched a global awareness campaign to improve understanding of the link between rainforests and climate change and the need for urgent action to stop deforestation in the run up to the climate change conference in Copenhagen in December 2009. A number of celebrities worked with the PRP to promote the campaign.

The Prince's Rainforest Project is now a part of the International Sustainability Unit, which was also created by the Prince in relation to international deforestation.

See also
Deforestation
Global warming
Biodiversity
Indigenous peoples
 Related charities such as Rainforest Foundation Fund, Save the Amazon Rainforest Organisation, and the Rainforest Action Network
United Nations Environment Programme

References

External links
 The Prince's Rainforests Project website
 International Sustainability Unit

The Prince's Trust
Environmental charities based in the United Kingdom
2007 establishments in the United Kingdom
Organizations established in 2007